Margaret Ward (c. 1550-1588) was a saint.

Margaret Ward may refer to:

Margaret Ward (journalist), Irish journalist
Margaret E. Ward, Irish chief executive
Maggie Ward, editor of What the Stuarts Did for Us
Peggy Ward, Countess Munster, see Sibyl, Lady Colefax
Margaret Ward (actor) in Flying the Flag
Margaret Ward (golfer), competed against Betsy King

Characters
Maggie Ward, character in The Search for Maggie Ward
Maggie Ward, character in Class Action (film)
Peggy Ward, character in Im Banne des Unheimlichen

See also
St Margaret Ward Catholic Academy